Second Hand Planet is the second album of New Zealand rock group, Opshop released in 2007 under Siren Records. A double disk 'Souvenir Edition' was released on 17 November 2008. The album was certified 3× Platinum in New Zealand on February 8, 2009, selling over 45,000 copies.

Track listing

Original release
"Big Energy In Little Spaces"
"Helpless"
"Waiting Now"
"Smoke and Mirrors"
"Days To Come"
"Maybe"
"Cosmonaut’s Boot"
"Noah"
"One Thing Worth Preserving"
"Nothing To Hide"
"One Day"

Souvenir edition bonus disk
Opshop Video History
 "Big Energy"
 "One Day"
 "Waiting Now"
 "Maybe"
 "Oxygen"
 "Levitate"
 "Being"
 "No Ordinary Thing"
 "Saturated"
 "Secrets"
 "Nothing Can Wait"

Bonus audio tracks from the Big Energy in a Can tour
Special feature: Opshop at the MTV Snow Jam'08
Photo Gallery

Charts

Awards

References

2007 albums
Opshop albums
Albums produced by Greg Haver